Roger Charles Hirst (born July 1960) is an English politician, the current Police, Fire, and Crime Commissioner for Essex, representing the Conservative Party. He was elected to the post on 5 May 2016, succeeding the previous incumbent, Nick Alston. He was re-elected in 2021.

Mr Hirst was a Cabinet Member for Essex County Council, and Deputy Leader of Brentwood Borough Council ("BBC"), until he stood down to focus on the PCC campaign. He was first elected as a BBC councillor for the ward of Hutton South in an 2009 by election.

References

1960 births
Living people
Police and crime commissioners in England
Conservative Party police and crime commissioners
Members of Essex County Council